Savelugu-Nanton Municipal District is a former district that was located in Northern Region, Ghana. Originally created as an ordinary district assembly in 1988; which was created from the former West Dagomba District Council. It was later elevated to municipal district assembly status on 1 March 2012. However on 28 June 2012, it was split off into two new districts: Savelugu Municipal District (capital: Savelugu) and Nanton District (capital: Nanton). The municipality was located in the eastern part of Northern Region and had Nanton as its capital town.

Background 
Savelugu-Nanton Municipal District had 149 communities, of which five were area councils, aside Savelugu being the capital. The area councils were Nanton, Pong-Tamale, Diare, Moglaa and Tampion. The population of this district according to the 2000 population census was 91,415 having a growth rate of 3%. 109,442 was the projected population as at March 2006 with its breakdown being 49% male and 51% female with a land area of 1790.7 km2.

Localities 
 Kadia
 Naabogu

External links 
 Savelugu-Nanton Municipal District Info
 
 GhanaDistricts.com

References 

Savelugu-Nanton District

Districts of the Northern Region (Ghana)

Dagbon